Norakert is a village in the Vardenis Municipality of the Gegharkunik Province of Armenia.

History 
Norakert was founded in 1927 as a state farm specializing in growing wheat for seed.

References

External links 
 
 

Populated places in Gegharkunik Province
Populated places established in 1927
Cities and towns built in the Soviet Union